Cambrian Bluff is a prominent bluff jutting into the north side of Nimrod Glacier and forming the south end of the Holyoake Range. It was named by the southern party of the New Zealand Geological Survey Antarctic Expedition (1960–61) because the bluff is faced with vast seams of pink and white marble.

References
 

Cliffs of the Ross Dependency
Shackleton Coast